Robert Bledsoe Mayfield (January 1, 1869 - December 4, 1934) was an artist known primarily for his landscapes, interiors, and etchings.  His artistic career was spent mostly in New Orleans, Louisiana.  Many of Mayfield's paintings on canvas reside at the New Orleans Museum of Art.

Early life and training

Mayfield was born in Carlinville, Illinois on January 1, 1869.  His artistic training was at the St. Louis School of Fine Arts and subsequently the Julian Academy in Paris under Lefebvre and Constant.  Luc-Olivier Merson also mentored him.

Artistic career

Mayfield spent the majority of his artistic career in New Orleans, Louisiana.  In 1908 he was awarded the first gold medal of the New Orleans Art Association. Notable works include "In the Studio" and "The Giant Oak" which are displayed in the New Orleans Museum of Art. He served for a time on the museum's committee for painting and sculpture and was an executive committee member for the New Orleans Art Association, where he displayed some of his work. Mayfield also served as associate editor of art for the New Orleans Times-Picayune.

References

External links
 Various private galleries trade in Mayfield's artworks.

Gallery 

19th-century American artists
20th-century American artists
Artists from New Orleans
1869 births
1934 deaths
People from Carlinville, Illinois